Catarrhospora is a genus of two species of lichens in the family Lecideaceae that are found in South Africa. The genus was circumscribed by lichenologist Franklin Andrej Brusse in 1994.

References

Lecideales genera
Lichen genera
Lecideales
Taxa described in 1994